Charlton Tobias is a  South African presenter working for the Port Elizabeth based media company Algoa FM.

References 

Living people
South African television presenters
1975 births